Curran Oi (born October 19, 1990) is an American figure skater. He won two ISU Junior Grand Prix silver medals and placed fifth at the 2009 World Junior Championships. He is the founder of Stats on Ice, an online statistics database on figure skaters.

Personal life 
Curran Oi was born on October 19, 1990 in Boston, Massachusetts. He is the brother of Bryna Oi, the 2011 Japanese national ice dancing champion with Taiyo Mizutani. His brother, Aidan Oi, competed in swimming and attended Boston University Academy.

Curran Oi began attending the Massachusetts Institute of Technology in 2009, graduating in 2013 with a degree in nuclear engineering and physics. He then enrolled as a PhD student in biophysics at Yale University.

Career 
Oi began skating at age six after seeing the sport on television. He trained at the Skating Club of Boston under Mark Mitchell and Peter Johansson. He won a silver medal on the Junior Grand Prix circuit in his first year on it and placed 5th at the 2006 Junior Grand Prix Final.

Oi was selected for the 2008 and 2009 U.S. Figure Skating Scholastics Honors Team.

Oi announced that he would not compete in the 2009–10 season in order to focus on his studies. In 2014, he started skating again, and has been coached by Matthew Savoie once a week.

Programs

Competitive highlights
JGP: ISU Junior Grand Prix

References

External links

 
 Stats on Ice

American male single skaters
1990 births
Living people
Figure skaters from Boston